Coscinesthes minuta is a species of beetle in the family Cerambycidae. It was described by Pu in 1985.

References

Lamiini
Beetles described in 1985